Wet N Wild was an indoor water park situated in North Shields, Tyne and Wear, England. It was the United Kingdom's largest indoor water park when opened in 1993, a title subsequently claimed by Sandcastle Waterpark. The park was situated in the Royal Quays complex, and featured numerous slides, a wave machine, and rapids. It was confirmed Wet N Wild would reopen following a takeover by Moirai Capital Investments. As of 2020, the park has once again closed. It is currently unknown if it will reopen as a waterpark.

Slides and facilities

Wet N Wild had several main, large water slides, The Kamikaze which included an 80-foot drop, The Tornado which included two slides that snaked round each other on which you could race your friends. The Abyss, which included two large drops, The Black Hole, a double tire slide, Calamity Canyon which included a number of small slides and whirlpools. All slides were supplied by Australian Waterslides and Leisure. The waterpark also had a small children's area, called Discovery Island.

The Black Hole was a 2-person Tyre slide and it had been suggested that was the most recognised star attraction slide at Wet N Wild North Shields within its long history.

There were also smaller slides. A lazy river was also an attraction. A small outdoor pool would be open during the summer. This pool had picnic benches to the side of it.

One of Wet N Wild's main selling points when it first opened was its controlled indoor climate, heated to a "tropical" 29 degrees Celsius. This meant that visitors could spend time out of the water, queueing for the slides or visiting the cafe, without noticing a drop in temperature. However, this was extremely costly, and was abandoned when the park reopened in 2014.

Changing Room facilities were mainly situated below the cafe area and included over 300 lockers and over 20 changing room cubicles both single and double. Baby changing facilities were also available for parents.

Food and drink was served at the Crusoe's Galley café (The Beach Hut Café in 2014) and was situated near the stairs to the pool and admission booth. Food mainly included burgers and chips, snacks such as chocolate bars and crisps. Drinks mainly included water, pop, slush, Coffee and Tea.

2020 Closure

In 2020, the lease holders Serco Leisure announced that the park would not reopen in that year. Later in the 2020, having leased the park for six years, Serco Leisure bought the building outright, however have yet to confirm if the park will be reopened as a going concern or if the site will be redeveloped.

References

External links

Water parks in the United Kingdom
Defunct amusement parks in the United Kingdom
Defunct amusement parks in England
North Shields
1993 establishments in England
Companies that have entered administration in the United Kingdom
2013 disestablishments in England
2014 establishments in England
2020 disestablishments in England